Something to Live For: A Billy Strayhorn Songbook is an album by the pianist John Hicks, recorded in 1997 and released on the HighNote label. The album contains ten compositions by Billy Strayhorn, along with two by Hicks.

Reception
AllMusic wrote that Hicks "shows his softer side here, tackling the lush romanticism of Strayhorn's timeless compositions with an appropriately light touch and sense of nuance". JazzTimes called it "a fine stroll through familiar Strayhorn terrain that pays substantial dividends".

Track listing 
All compositions by Billy Strayhorn except as indicated
 "Something to Live For" (Duke Ellington, Billy Strayhorn) - 5:44
 "Day Dream" (Ellington, Strayhorn John La Touche) - 6:40
 "Medley: Lotus/Blossom" - 4:08 		
 "Blood Count" - 6:59 		
 "A Flower Is a Lovesome Thing" - 3:07
 "Chelsea Bridge" - 6:10 		
 "Lush Life" - 6:05
 "U.M.M.G. (Upper Manhattan Medical Group)" - 5:30
 "Minor Blues" (John Hicks) - 4:33 		
 "Passion Flower" - 6:42 		
 "Satin Doll" (Ellington, Strayhorn, Johnny Mercer) - 5:23
 "Summary" (Hicks) - 4:56

Personnel 
John Hicks - piano
Dwayne Dolphin - bass
Cecil Brooks III - drums

Production
Cecil Brooks III - producer
Dino DeStefano - engineer

References 

John Hicks (jazz pianist) albums
1998 albums
HighNote Records albums
Tribute albums